Kangle is a railway station on the Taiwan Railways Administration South-link line located in Taitung City, Taitung County, Taiwan.

History
The station was opened on 15 July 1985.

Nearby stations
Taiwan Railways Administration
  <-- South-link line -->

Around the station
 National Museum of Prehistory
 Taitung Airport

See also
 List of railway stations in Taiwan

References

1985 establishments in Taiwan
Railway stations in Taitung County
Railway stations opened in 1985
Railway stations served by Taiwan Railways Administration